The 2017 Liga 3 Jambi is the third edition of Liga 3 Jambi as a qualifying round for the 2017 Liga 3. 

The competition starts on 3 August 2017.

Teams
There are 8 clubs which will participate the league in this season.

References 

2017 in Indonesian football